The Voice Kids is a German reality talent show created by John de Mol and a junior version of The Voice of Germany. Based on the original The Voice Kids of Holland, the show was developed for children between the ages of 7 and 15. It began airing on Sat.1 on April 5, 2013.

There are five different stages to the show: producers' auditions, blind auditions, battle rounds, sing-offs, and final. There have been ten winners to date: Michèle Bircher (12), Danyiom Mesmer (14), Noah-Levi Korth (13), Lukas Janisch (13), Sofie Thomas (11), Anisa Celik (10), Mimi & Josefin (13 & 15), Lisa-Marie Ramm (15), Egon Werler (15), and Georgia Balke (11).

Since its inaugural season, Thore Schölermann has served as host. A second main presenter was introduced in 2015, with Chantal Janzen from 2015 to 2016, Debbie Schippers from 2017 to 2018 and Melissa Khalaj from 2019 onward. Aline von Drateln was a backstage presenter in 2013 and was replaced by Nela Lee in 2014. The coaches for the most recent season were Lena Meyer-Landrut, Álvaro Soler, Wincent Weiss and the duo Michi Beck & Smudo. Other coaches from previous seasons include Stefanie Kloß, Henning Wehland, Tim Bendzko, Johannes Strate, Mark Forster, Sasha Schmitz, the duo Nena & Larissa Kerner, Max Giesinger, the duo The BossHoss and from the band Deine Freunde, Lukas Nimscheck & Flo Sump.

Format 
On 25 October 2012, Sat1 announced that they will produce the a children's version of The Voice of Germany with Talpa and Schwartzkopff TV Productions. The new show, The Voice Kids, is based on the format of the original show and focuses on children between the ages of 8 and 15. Performers for the first season had to apply to participate, and about 70 children were cast for the first phase, the "Blind Auditions". The children are onstage with a large, curved curtain around them, effectively concealing their identity from the judges, audience, and viewers. The 3 jury members are sitting in swivel chairs with their backs to the stage. During the performance, they can elect to support a candidate by pressing a buzzer, which will automatically turn their seat towards the stage. At the end of their performance, the curtain drops, revealing the singer who then learns whether any chairs turned for them. If only one judge turns their chair, the candidate is automatically on their team. If more than one chair turns, the candidate chooses who they would like to have as their coach.

The second week of the competition is training week in which the coaches prepare their candidates for the second phase of competition, called the "Battle Round." In the Battle Round three candidates of the same coaching group are chosen to sing the same song as a trio. Each coach then picks one of their three candidates to continue on to the Final round. Starting on Season 9, coaches can steal one losing artist from the battle rounds via "Steal Deal." Also, in the same season, the coaches can send an artist directly to the final via "Fast Pass."

The winner of The Voice Kids receives a training stipend of €15,000 and an optional recording contract. The parents of the victor decide whether they pursue this option or not.

The Voice Kids Germany is the most internationally popular version of The Voice concept with a large YouTube audience for its clips with strong audience interest that stretches far beyond fellow Europeans from Brazil to Vietnam, the Philippines and New Zealand. This is in part due to the fact that the contestants often have a multicultural background with one German parent and one immigrant parent or are first generation German born to an immigrant family. This YouTube impact is exemplified by then-13-year-old performer Laura Kamhuber, born in Austria, whose performance of Dolly Parton's classic "I Will Always Love You" (popularized by Whitney Houston) in the blind audition of the first (2013) series has garnered over 200 million views on YouTube (as of April 17), and is the most watched YouTube video by an Austrian artist. However, the channel deleted that video and re-uploaded in July 2021.

Coaches and presenters

Coaches

Presenters

 Key
 Main presenter
 Backstage presenter
 Backstage-online presenter

Coaches and finalists 
 Winner
 Finalists
 Fast past to the Final

 Winners are in bold, the finalists that went in the televoting are in italicized font, and the eliminated artists are in small font.

Series overview 
Warning: the following table presents a significant amount of different colors.

Notes

Seasons' synopsis 

 Winner
 Runner-up
 Eliminated in the Final
 Stolen in the Sing-offs
 Eliminated in the Sing-offs
 Stolen in the Battles
 Eliminated in the Battles

Season 1 (2013) 
The first season of The Voice Kids in Germany premiered on 5 April 2013 and ended on 10 May on Sat.1. The coaches were Tim Bendzko, Lena Meyer-Landrut and Henning Wehland. The inaugural season was hosted by Thore Schölermann. The winner was Swiss-born Michèle Bircher from Team Henning Wehland.

Season 2 (2014) 
The second season of The Voice Kids in Germany premiered on 21 March 2014 and ended on 9 May on Sat.1. Lena Meyer-Landrut and Henning Wehland returned for their second season as coaches. Johannes Strate completed the panel, replacing Tim Bendzko. Thore Schölermann returned for his second season as host. The  winner was Danyiom Mesmer from Team Henning Wehland.

Season 3 (2015) 
The third season of The Voice Kids in Germany premiered on 27 February 2015 and ended on 24 April on Sat.1. Lena Meyer-Landrut returned for her third season as coach, and Johannes Strate returned for his second season as coach. Mark Forster completed the panel, replacing Henning Wehland. Thore Schölermann returned for his third season as host. The winner was Noah-Levi Korth from team Lena Meyer-Landrut.

Season 4 (2016) 
The fourth season of The Voice Kids in Germany premiered on 5 February 2016 and ended on 25 March on Sat.1. Lena Meyer-Landrut returned for her fourth season as coach, and Mark Forster returned for his second season as coach. Sasha Schmitz completed the panel, replacing Johannes Strate. Thore Schölermann returned for his fourth season as host. The winner was Lukas Janisch from team Mark Forster.

Season 5 (2017) 
The fifth season of The Voice Kids in Germany premiered on 5 February 2017 and ended on 26 March on Sat.1. Mark Forster returned for his third season as coach, and Sasha Schmitz returned for his second season as coach. Former coach from the adult version, Nena and her daughter Larissa Kerner completed the panel as a duo coach replacing Lena Meyer-Landrut. Thore Schölermann returned for his fifth season as host. The winner was Sofie Thomas from team Nena & Larissa.

Season 6 (2018) 
The sixth season of The Voice Kids in Germany premiered on 11 February 2018 and ended on 15 April on Sat.1. Mark Forster returned for his fourth season as coach, while Nena & Larissa Kerner returned for their second season as coaches. The Voice of Germany season 1 finalist Max Giesinger joined the panel as a new coach replacing Sascha Schmitz. Thore Schölermann returned for his sixth season as host. The winner was Anisa Celik from team Mark Forster.

Season 7 (2019) 
The seventh season of The Voice Kids in Germany premiered on 17 February 2019 on Sat.1. For the first time in the show's history, the coaching panel would consist of four coaches instead of three. Mark Forster was joined by Lena Meyer-Landrut who returned after two seasons of absence, with Stefanie Kloss and The BossHoss joining as new coaches. This is also the first season wherein there are two female coaches in the panel. Thore Schölermann returned for his seventh season as host, with Melissa Khalaj as the new host replacing Debbie Schippers. Iggy Kelly joined as new Backstage-Online. The winners were sisters Mimi & Josefin from Team The BossHoss.

Season 8 (2020) 
The eighth season of The Voice Kids in Germany premiered on February 23, 2020 on Sat.1. Lena Meyer-Landrut was joined by Max Giesinger, who last coached in the sixth season, Sasha Schmitz, who last coached two seasons prior, and with the new duo coach Lukas Nimscheck & Flo Sump (Deine Freunde). Thore Schölermann returned for his eighth season and Melissa Khalaj returned for her second season as hosts. However, the backstage moderators were new: Last year's winners, the sibling duo Mimi & Josefin, returned to the music show in this function. The winner was Lisa-Marie Ramm from Team Sasha. The live shows were filmed at an empty auditorium following Germany's COVID-19 pandemic.

Season 9 (2021) 
The ninth season of The Voice Kids in Germany premiered on February 27, 2021 on Sat.1. On November 15, 2020, it was announced that Stefanie Kloss would return for her second season of the series, after one season hiatus. Kloss was joined by former The Voice of Germany duo coach Michi & Smudo, and by debutants Álvaro Soler and Wincent Weiss. Hosting, Thore Schölermann returned for his ninth season and Melissa Khalaj returned for her third season. The backstage host for the ninth season was Keanu Rapp, who was as a participant in the third season.

Season 10 (2022) 
The tenth season of The Voice Kids in Germany premiered on March 4, 2022 on Sat.1. On October 31, 2021, it was announced that duo coach Michi & Smudo, Álvaro Soler and Wincent Weiss would all return for their second respective seasons, alongside Lena Meyer-Landrut who returned after a one season hiatus. Hosting, Thore Schölermann returned for his tenth season and Melissa Khalaj returned for her fourth season. Keanu Rapp returned as backstage host for the tenth season, alongside season nine winner Egon Werler.

This season featured "All-Star" performances during the audition phase, including  Mike Singer (S1), Chiara Castelli (S2), LOI (S5), and Benicio Bryant (S6). Past coaches Henning and Max appeared as well during the performances of Chiara and Benicio respectively.

This season was also known for multiple concerns resulting in additional quarantines. During the battles phase, coach Lena was only able to prepare via videochat, while coaches Smudo and Alvaro had to appear during the battles themselves via video. Alongside this, a multitude of contestants were unable to participate in the battles due to quarantine, including 2 members of De Breaks, Georgia, Lisa of Lisa & Lucy, Liv, Maiara, and Nina. Georgia, Liv, Maiara and Nina participated in a "Community Ticket" where one would get voted by the public to the finals (won by Georgia), while De Breaks and Lucy had to partake in battles without their remaining group members (where both acts lost their battles). De Breaks and Lisa & Lucy would later perform as full groups during the finals as guests.

Season 11 (2023)

References

External links 

 Official website 

2013 German television series debuts
Sat.1 original programming
Kids Germany
German-language television shows
Television series about children
Television series about teenagers